The 1961 Texas Longhorns football team represented the University of Texas at Austin during the 1961 NCAA University Division football season. The 1961 season was first season that Texas wore the "Bevo" Longhorn decal on their helmets.  Texas debuted the helmet decal in season opener against Cal in Berkeley, and have continued to wear it ever since.

Schedule

Personnel

Season summary

TCU

Awards and honors
Mike Cotten, Quarterback, Cotton Bowl co-Most Valuable Player
Bob Moses, End, Cotton Bowl co-Most Valuable Player
Jimmy Saxton, Back, Consensus All-American

References

Texas
Texas Longhorns football seasons
Southwest Conference football champion seasons
Cotton Bowl Classic champion seasons
Texas Longhorns football